Rodolfo Galindo Ramirez (September 27, 1923 – July 19, 1999) was a Mexican luchador and film actor, best known by his ring name Cavernario Galindo (Caveman Galindo), who was active in Consejo Mundial de Lucha Libre from the 1930s to the 1990s. Well known for inventing La Cavernaria (a Modified surfboard hold), a commonly used submission hold in modern Lucha Libre.

Biography
Ramirez was born and raised in Chihuahua, Mexico. As a young boy he would survive a car accident that would leave him with noticeable facial scars for the rest of his life.

Galindo made his debut as a wrestler in 1938 at the age of fifteen under the name Ruddy Valentino. He would also wrestle as Ruddy Galindo before taking up the name that made him famous. His slight build combined with his brawler style of fighting made it unlikely that he would find much success in Mexican lucha libre.

A few years into Galindo's career Salvador Lutteroth, the founder and owner of Empresa Mexicana de la Lucha Libre noticed the young brawler and taking note of the young man's ugly appearance that resulted from his facial scars, gave him the gimmick as the animalistic Cavernario Galindo. Taking advantage of the opportunity, Galindo played his character for all that it was worth. In the ring his character would bite, claw, and brutally brawl with any opponent he came across to the boos of sold out crowds across Mexico. One particular story, which may be an urban legend, persists to this day. According to some accounts, in the 1940s, Galindo tore a live snake apart with his bare hands and teeth in front of a horrified audience before one of his matches.

On July 1, 1949, he defeated Tarzán Lopez in Mexico City to win the only title he'd ever hold during his career, the National Light Heavyweight Title. He successfully defended the title for more than a year until he lost it during December 1950 against Enrique Llanes.

The feud that defined Galindo's career more than any other took place in the 1950s. Gory Guerrero was a handsome and skilled technical wrestler, the exact opposite of Galindo's brawling character. Their multiple feuds are seen to this day as being among the bloodiest and most violent in the history of lucha libre. Galindo was known for his hoarse speaking voice which was the result of a throat injury he suffered during one of his matches against Guerrero. Galindo also feuded with the top luchadores of his generation, including El Santo, Blue Demon, and Black Shadow.

His popularity lasted for decades and he continued to wrestle until the 1990s, in his seventies. His career only ended when he broke one of his vertebra. He died a few years after this injury on July 19, 1999 at the age of seventy-five. In 1996, he was inducted into the Wrestling Observer Newsletter Hall of Fame.

Championships and accomplishments
Empresa Mexicana de Lucha Libre
Mexican National Light Heavyweight Championship (1 time)
Wrestling Observer Newsletter awards
Wrestling Observer Newsletter Hall of Fame (Class of 1996)

Luchas de Apuestas record

Filmography
Galindo starred in several lucha films, usually in a supporting role or as a villain, but sometimes as a zombie or another fictitious character.

Ruletera, La - 1987
Leones del ring contra la Cosa Nostra, Los - 1974
Leones del ring, Los - 1974
Bestias del terror, Las - 1973
Santo el enmascarado de plata y Blue Demon contra los monstruos - 1970
Blue Demon contra cerebros infernales - 1968
Isla de los dinosaurios, La - 1967
Mujeres panteras, Las - 1967
Lobas del ring, Las - 1965
Fenómenos del futbol, Los - 1964
Santo en el museo de cera - 1963
Luchadoras contra el médico asesino, Las - 1963
Señor Tormenta, El - 1963
Tigres del ring, Los - 1960
Última lucha, La - 1959
The Magnificent Beast - 1953

References

1923 births
1999 deaths
Mexican male professional wrestlers
Mexican male film actors
Professional wrestlers from Chihuahua (state)
People from Chihuahua City
20th-century Mexican male actors
20th-century professional wrestlers
Mexican National Light Heavyweight Champions